T-complex protein 10A homolog 2 is a protein that in humans is encoded by the TCP10L gene.
It is located next to CFAP298.

References

Further reading